The Battle of Loano occurred on 23–24 November 1795 during the War of the First Coalition. The French Army of Italy led by Barthélemy Schérer defeated the combined Austrian and Sardinian forces under Olivier, Count of Wallis.

Context

In September 1795, General of Division Schérer replaced François Kellermann in command of the Army of Italy. Facing the French were 30,000 Austrians and 12,000 Piedmontese under the overall command of Feldzeugmeister (FZM) Joseph Nikolaus De Vins and Benedetto of Savoy, Duke of Chablais.

Relations between the Austrians and the Piedmontese remained touchy, even though the latter force was led by an Austrian officer, Feldmarschal-Leutnant Michelangelo Colli. The politicians in Paris insisted that Schérer mount an offensive. This was urged on by General of Brigade Napoleon Bonaparte, then a military planner at the War Ministry.

The centre of the French army, under the orders of General of Division André Masséna, was formed of two old Army of Italy divisions. A third Army of Italy division formed the left wing, commanded by General of Division Jean Sérurier. The right wing, under General of Division Pierre Augereau recently arrived with Schérer from the armies of the Pyrénées. One more division, remaining at Col de Tende, covered Saorge. This army of 40,000 men lacked provisions, decent clothing and munitions, since the British Royal Navy had cut off its supply lines to Genoa. The Austro-Sardinian army was 53,000 strong. On its left the allied defensive works touched the sea at Loano on the Italian Riviera. Its right was anchored in the Piedmont mountains with strongholds at Ceva, Cuneo and Mondovì. This position was made up of apparently impregnable posts, linked together by trenches and defended by 100 artillery pieces.

Schérer arrived in terrain he did not know but was modest enough to criticise his own abilities and put planning of the attack in the hands of experienced generals in his camp. Masséna had already proved himself the most able of Schérer's colleagues and was put in charge of the planning. One of the most painful privations suffered by the French soldiers was the lack of shoes in the midst of snow, rocky crags and stony roads. They wrapped their feet in linen, bandages and straps but these proved insufficient. Luckily a brig got past the British warships and arrived before the battle, bringing 100,000 biscuit rations and 24,000 pairs of shoes, raising morale throughout the camp. These were distributed to the weak and suffering first, then to those who had distinguished themselves in action, though many in the army still remained barefoot. One old grenadier quipped that, from tomorrow, the enemy would be responsible for supplying them with shoes.

On 17 November, General of Division Étienne Charlet attacked the Austro-Sardinians at Campo di Pietri, surprising them, destroying their trenches and capturing three cannon and 500 prisoners. However, a spell of bad weather forced Masséna to give up the attack he had planned on the right, and he resolved to operate in the centre, take the enemy positions there, pass over them and take the other positions in the rear of the enemy line. Masséna was instructed to carry out this bold plan himself.

Unaware of the impending attack, De Vins pleaded illness and gave up his command on 22 November. FZM Wallis took command of the combined allied armies.

Battle

The French made three attacks, one a feint and the other two in earnest. Schérer sent Augereau and the right wing at Borghetto Santo Spirito to overrun the enemy left flank. Meanwhile, Sérurier and the left wing at Ormea would hold the enemy facing them in check. On 22 November Masséna set out at nightfall from Zuccarello with two divisions to attack the enemy centre. At daybreak he made a brief speech of encouragement to his troops telling that victory was in their bayonets before commencing the attack.

Masséna seized all the enemy positions as far as Bardineto at the charge. There the Austrians put up a fierce and long resistance and Masséna, indignant at the delay, called in his reserve and battle recommenced with fury. Étienne Charlet rushed on the first of the enemy trenches but received a mortal wound and fell. His death whipped the French troops into rage and their serried ranks and bayonets rushed on the enemy in a compact mass and put them completely to rout.

During this time Augereau successfully attacked the left wing from Loano to the heights occupied by General-Major (GM) Eugène-Guillaume Argenteau, taking the positions one by one. The grand Castellaro, defended by GM Mathias Rukavina and his 1,200 men, put up greater resistance. Augereau finally ordered Rukavina to lay down his arms but refused to accept the Austrian's conditions that he be allowed to leave the redoubt with his arms and baggage train. Instead, the French general give him 10 minutes to surrender unconditionally. Rukavina refused though Augereau showed him Claude Victor's brigade deployed in front of him. It was initially believed that this was a bluff but Rukavina, determined to die gloriously, made a sortie from the redoubt, falling in fury on the 117th and 118th Line Infantry Demi-Brigades. He forced them to retreat despite fire from other units. This greatly astonished the French troops, who admired the Austrian's resolution.

However, the Austro-Sardinians rallied to Mont Carmelo to snatch victory from an enemy that they believed to be exhausted after 10 hours of fighting. Realising this, Schérer advanced against them with his right but hesitated, uncertain of what had happened to Masséna in the centre. He was reassured by a message from Masséna and he continued his advance but all at once a wet fog accompanied by flurries of snow and hail descended, cutting off the daylight and putting an end to his pursuit. Whole ranks were knocked over or turned to retreat by the storm gusts and many of the dead and wounded on the battlefield were victims of the weather rather than enemy action. The Austrians took advantage of the storms to retreat, abandoning cannon, caissons and tents. Augereau pursued them with light troops, whilst Masséna marched on despite the problems and had Colonel Barthélemy Joubert occupy the defiles of Saint-Jacques. All that remained for the Austrians were the mountain trails and the Bormida valley.

It was then the turn of Sérurier who, on 23 and 24, only had to contain the Austro-Sardinian right wing. He carried out an impetuous attack on the Piedmontese army, completely beat it, captured all its artillery and forced them to join back up with the remains of Argenteau's force at the entrenched camp at Ceva. Of 25,000 engaged, the French lost 2,500 killed and wounded, plus 500 captured. Allied losses numbered 3,000 killed and wounded, and 4,000 men and 48 cannons captured out of 18,000 troops present.

The French victory was entirely due to Masséna's boldness and planning. The triumph was not followed-up because of Schérer's caution, a "poorly conducted" pursuit, and the onset of winter weather. Soon after, both armies entered winter quarters. However, Loano enabled the French access to resupply and provided a foothold in the Ligurian Alps which would be exploited in April 1796 by General Bonaparte in the Montenotte Campaign.

References

Sources
 Boycott-Brown, Martin. The Road to Rivoli. London: Cassell & Co., 2001. 
 Chandler, David. The Campaigns of Napoleon New York: Macmillan, 1966.

 Smith, Digby. The Napoleonic Wars Data Book. London: Greenhill, 1998. 

Conflicts in 1795
Battles involving Austria
Battles involving Italy
Battles involving the Kingdom of Sardinia
Battles of the War of the First Coalition
Battles in Liguria
Battles inscribed on the Arc de Triomphe